FIFA World Cup official mascots are a series of unique characters for each event. The trend began with the 1966 FIFA World Cup having World Cup Willie, one of the first mascots to be associated with a major sporting competition. The mascot designs represent a characteristic of the host country, such as flora, fauna, or costume. The design is frequently one or more anthropomorphic characters targeted at children and coinciding with cartoon shows and merchandise.

List of mascots

See also
 List of FIFA Women's World Cup official mascots
 List of UEFA European Championship official mascots
 List of Copa América official mascots
 List of Africa Cup of Nations official mascots
 List of AFC Asian Cup official mascots

References

External links
 Information on Goleo VI and Pille
 Official FIFA web page on Zakumi

 
Association football mascots
Lists of mascots